Bernardino Scannafora (died 1529) was a Roman Catholic prelate who served as Bishop of Castro di Puglia (1504–1529) and Bishop of Lavello (1504).

Biography
On 1 January 1504, he was appointed during the papacy of Pope Julius II as Bishop of Lavello.
On 19 January 1504, he was appointed during the papacy of Pope Julius II as Bishop of Castro di Puglia.
He served as Bishop of Castro di Puglia until his death in 1529.

References

External links and additional sources
 (Chronology of Bishops) 
 (Chronology of Bishops) 
 (Chronology of Bishops) 
 (Chronology of Bishops) 

16th-century Italian Roman Catholic bishops
Bishops appointed by Pope Julius II
1529 deaths